Eastern Suburbs Association Football Club is a professional Association football club based in the suburb of Kohimarama in Auckland, New Zealand. The club competes in the Northern League.

Club history
Eastern Suburbs was formed in 1934 as a result of the merger of Tamaki United AFC (formed 1924) and Glen Innes (formed 1930). One of the country's strongest clubs, it has won all major honours in the country, including winning the prestigious national Chatham Cup on six occasions.

Eastern Suburbs First Team is coached by Kane Wintersgill.

Players

Current squad

Performance in OFC competitions

Honours

New Zealand Football Championship
Champions (1): 2018–19

New Zealand National Soccer League
Champions (1): 1971
Total: 2 titles

Chatham Cup
Champions (6): 1951, 1953, 1965, 1968, 1969, 2015

Northern Premier League
Champions (3): 1965, 1966, 2015

Auckland FA
Champions (7): 1948, 1950, 1951, 1952, 1953, 1957, 1962

References

External links
Official site
Auckland Football Federation

Association football clubs in Auckland
Association football clubs established in 1934
1934 establishments in New Zealand